Cheqa Jangeh or Cheqa Jengah, also rendered as Chaqa Janga, Chegha Changa, Cheqa Jenga, Chega Janga, Chega Jangeh, or Cheqa Jengay, may refer to:
 Cheqa Jangeh-ye Olya
 Cheqa Jangeh-ye Sofla